Eastwood High School is a comprehensive, non-denominational school located centrally in East Renfrewshire to the south of Glasgow, Scotland. It is one of the successor schools to Eastwood Senior Secondary School which opened in 1936 in Clarkston, Glasgow. The head teacher is Kate Sinclair.

Eastwood High School is situated on Capelrig Road and has a large suburban, and partly rural, catchment area. It stands in the grounds of Capelrig House constructed in 1769, which is a Category A building listed as being of architectural and historical importance. The school serves the immediate area of Newton Mearns and the villages of Neilston and Uplawmoor.

Eastwood High School's cluster primary schools are Crookfur, Mearns, Neilston and Uplawmoor.

A new state-of-the-art school building was built, replacing the 1960s building, and is now in full use. It was opened in August 2013. This has improved the teaching facilities and the whole school environment and has been a major step in developing further the pupil experience. The improvements include two all-weather pitches and a new sports complex.

Presently, the school roll is 1500 pupils. This is expected to increase due to the extensive housebuilding currently taking place around the school.

Achievements
 Scottish Education Award (2005)
 Award for Multicultural Education from the University of Aberdeen's
 Investors in People award since 2005

 Scotland's Evening Times ranked the Eastwood High School seventh in West Scotland in its 2009 rankings.
 Listed in the Herald Scotland top fifty schools in Scotland (2011), with 21% of Eastwood High pupils achieving 5 or more Highers
 Gained Silver award (June 2010) in the Eco Schools Scotland Award Program
 Fair Trade School Status 2013

New school building

Work began on the new £32 million 'Eastwood High School' in August 2011. The building is now complete and the school is now fully functional. There is a swimming pool, sports halls, all-weather running track and sports grounds, which are also open to the public and clubs outwith school hours.

Inspections
Eastwood High was last inspected by HMIE in December 2006 and gained a very favourable report with only three points identified for action. These were addressed by the time of the local authority follow up inspection in 2008.

A further inspection was carried out in 2015. The report was very good and the pupils were noted as friendly and hardworking.

Departments
The subject areas in Eastwood High School are structured into nine faculties. Each has a faculty head who has overall management responsibility and leads the learning and teaching. The faculties are:

 English
 Mathematics
 Social Subjects (History/Geography/RMPS)
 Modern Languages (French/Spanish)
 Science (Biology/Chemistry/Physics)
 Technical Education/Home Economics
 Creative and Performing Arts (Art/Music/Drama)
 Physical Education
 BECS (Business Education and Computing Science)

Notable former pupils

Amy Corbett, designer (Lego Group), judge (Lego Masters (American TV series))
 Sir William Kerr Fraser GCB, senior civil servant and chancellor of Glasgow University
Ricky Gardiner, guitarist (Iggy Pop, David Bowie)
Ricky Gillies, footballer (St Mirren)
Kelly Macdonald, actress (Trainspotting, Nanny McPhee, Brave, No Country for Old Men)
 Peter May, author and screenwriter
Gordon McIlwham, Scottish International rugby player (Glasgow Hawks)
Shade Munro, Scottish International rugby player
David Newton, jazz pianist and composer
Tony Osoba, actor (Porridge, The Demon Headmaster)
Brian Robertson, guitarist (Thin Lizzy)
Craig Watson, footballer (East Fife FC)
Jon Welsh, rugby player (Glasgow Warriors)

References

External links
Eastwood High School's profile, Scottish Schools Online
Eastwood High School's official website

Secondary schools in East Renfrewshire
1936 establishments in Scotland
Educational institutions established in 1936
Newton Mearns